Port Nelson was a dredger that served from 1914 to 1924 in Manitoba, Canada.

History

In 1913 Canada's Department of Railways and Canals commissioned the Polson Ironworks, in Toronto, Ontario to build a large suction dredger to help construct what was to be the first port on North America's Arctic Ocean coast—to be named the Port Nelson.  She was completed in March, 1914, and towed to Hudson's Bay, arriving in September 1914, where she promptly ran aground.  A 1924 storm tossed her onto the artificial island she helped create, where her wreck remains today.

See also
 Hudson Bay Railway
 Seaport of the Prairies

References

External links

Dredgers
Port Nelson, Manitoba
Water transport in Manitoba
Shipwrecks of the Canadian Arctic coast
1914 ships